The Daily Collegian is a student-produced news outlet, with a newspaper and website, that is published independently at the Pennsylvania State University. The newspaper is printed twice a week during the fall and spring semesters, and once a week during the summer semester. It is distributed for free at the  University Park campus as well as mailed to subscribers across the country.

Collegian Inc., which publishes The Daily Collegian, is an independent, non-profit corporation and has a board of directors that is composed of faculty, students, and professionals. The mission statement of Collegian Inc. is "to publish a quality campus newspaper and to provide a rewarding educational experience for the student staff members."

The Daily Collegian has historically been considered one of the top student-run college newspapers in the United States receiving multiple notable journalism awards including National Pacemaker Awards, top rankings from The Princeton Review, and Sigma Delta Chi Awards.

History 
The Daily Collegian traces its founding back to the Free Lance, a monthly student magazine published by students and faculty of Pennsylvania State University, which began printing in April 1887. The Free Lance struggled structurally and financially eventually disbanding in April 1904. The next semester, in October 1904, the State Collegian emerged with much of the same leadership as the previous publication. The name of the publication was changed to the Penn State Collegian In 1911 and the paper began publishing on a semi-weekly basis in September 1920. The success of semi-weekly printing lead the paper to began publishing daily in 1940, changing its name to The Daily Collegian. Moving into the modern age, the Collegian pushed for a larger digital presence creating The Digital Collegian in 1996, the publications website that provides online access to articles digitally and print stories dating from 1988–present. Daily printing continued until 2017, when the Daily Collegian announced it would move away from printing five days a week and would instead print twice a week, on Mondays and Thursdays. The shift was made as a majority of the publication's readership was coming from its online publication.

The Free Lance 

The Free Lance was a monthly news magazine at Pennsylvania State University which was first published in April 1887. The first copies of the Free Lance were shipped to State College, Pennsylvania by the Bellefonte Central train. The arrival of the first issue of the publication was celebrated by a large group of students who waited for the train and paraded down College Avenue in Downtown State College to purchase their copy. The first issue of the news magazine was twelve pages long and was sold for fifteen cents a copy.

Most of the articles inside of the Free Lance were opinion pieces on national events penned by professors and alumni of the university. Much of the news coverage coming from the publication had already become public knowledge by the time each monthly edition was released. The Free Lance mostly took an approach to filling in holes in stories and giving opinion on events rather than reporting them first hand.

The Free Lance transitioned away from news and moved its focus to become a literary magazine publishing essays, poems and short stories in 1895. This move would inevitable lead the already cash strapped publication to collapse. In April 1901, as subscribers declined the Free Lance begged for support from the university, students, and alumni to continue its publication. Throughout the next three years editors continued to asks for financial support and payment from delinquent subscribers. The requests were not met and the magazine concluded publication with its April 1904 edition, which did not appear on campus until May of that year.

The State Collegian 

The semester after publication ceased on the Free Lance its former editor and much of the former periodical's staff founded the State Collegain, a weekly newspaper. The newspaper was established independent of University control and produced its first issue in October 1904. In its first edition the State Collegain Editor William B. Hoke penned an editorial outlining the decline of the Free Lance and how this new paper would be different. Hoke outlined a mission to have a paper that contained news and events from around the community citing the failure of its predecessor to its shift away from news based content.

The paper was published once a week on Thursdays, added photos and began printing in broadsheet form rather than on tabloid-size paper. The paper was printed by Nittany Printing and Publishing Co., publishers of the State College Times (now the Centre Daily Times) where the State Collegian shared a downtown office with the State College paper.

Penn State Collegian 

In 1911, the State Collegian made the decision to change its masthead and publication name to Penn State Collegian to be more definite and expressive of its location and mission to report on the university and student issues. In 1914 a subscriptions to the Penn State Collegian cost $1.50 per year. Printing of the publication was interrupted because of materials shortages caused by World War I during the fall semester of 1918. The publication began printing its paper semi-weekly, publishing Tuesday and Friday editions In the fall semester of 1920. Reporters covered all aspects of daily life as well as global events. In 1930 The Collegian moved its offices to "Journalism Alley," on the third floor of Old Main.

The Daily Collegian 

After the publishers of the Penn State Collegian approved a move to begin printing the newspaper daily the masthead of the paper was changed to the Daily Collegian. The publication began publishing five days a week, Tuesday through Saturday. During this transition the publishing offices of the paper were moved to the basement of the Carnegie Library, now known as the Carnegie Building. The first issue of the newly daily paper was published on September 5, 1940. More than a year after making the switch to daily print, Japan bombed Pearl Harbor and the U.S. entered World War II. The Daily Collegian cut production days because of due to wartime rationing and shortages of materials printing weekly instead of daily from 1944 until the beginning of 1947.

The Daily Collegian became a member of the Associated Press in 1956, submitting their stories to the wire service for publication at other member papers.

In 1961 The Collegian moved to 20 Sackett Building.

In 1972, The Collegian moved its office location to 126 Carnegie. In 1979 The Collegian earned the Associated Collegiate Press' Five Marks of Distinction for the second consecutive rating period. in the fall semester of 1979 The paper started production on The Weekly Collegian.

Digital Era 
In a move to the digital era the Collegian launched its first website, The Digital Collegian, in the summer of 1996. This allowed the paper to deliver news articles online and improve access to digitized articles from its historical print issues. Beginning with the Fall 2006 semester, "The Digital Collegian" was renamed "The Daily Collegian Online" and debuted a new home page layout. A Web department was formed with the purpose of creating online updates for breaking news and posting stories on days when classes were not in session.

Along with this launch came a project to digitize and make publicly accessible all issues of the Free Lance, State Collegian, Penn State Collegian and the Daily Collegian through 1922. At the time Collegian Inc. owned some of the last remaining paper copies of the Free Lance but the copies had yet to be scanned to microfilm to preserve them. Penn State's Libraries Special Collections/University Archives, Preservation and Digitization Department, and News and Microforms Library met with Collegian Inc. in spring of 2003 to discuss digitizing the last remaining copies. At the time only researchers, alumni, and students had access to historical print issues through bound issue books located at the University Archives. The proposed project set out to scan all issues April 1887-August 2, 1940, in total 16,000 page images, in a year or less. In spring of 2004, one year from the universities initial meeting with Collegian Inc., the 1887-1940 segment was completed and made publicly accessible online.

After the success of the initial project Collegian, Inc. granted permission to digitize all issues through 1988. The second scanning project was completed over four years, making in total 132,736 total pages publicly available in 2008. Penn State's Library provided all funding for conversion, software/hardware, on-going maintenance and upgrades. The project came in at a cost of $178,541.

The University Libraries allowed Google to crawl its database starting in 2007, making historical content searchable. With this came multiple lawsuits as formerly inaccessible articles on arrest and disciplinary reports became easily accessible to the public.

In July, 2010, in what was called a highly unusual move, two Centre County judges –– Judge Bradley P. Lunsford and Judge Thomas King Kistler –– ordered The Daily Collegian and The Centre Daily Times to delete archived news stories about five defendants in criminal cases after a lawyer sought to have the records expunged. The orders were obtained by State College lawyer Joe Amendola, who was quoted in The Philadelphia Inquirer saying: “What's the sense in having your record expunged if anyone can Google you and it comes up?” The five defendants had either pled guilty to criminal charges ranging from aggravated indecent assault to possession of marijuana, or completed pretrial diversion programs that resulted in no finding of guilt. Amendola said that an earlier client was having trouble finding employment despite having her criminal record expunged. Prospective employers Googled her name and found a 1992 Collegian article detailing her crime.

The expungement orders were eventually revised to remove any reference to the Centre Daily Times and the Daily Collegian on July 8, 2010. Judge Thomas Kistler told The Philadelphia Inquirer, "It was never anybody's intention to restrict [the papers].” Kistler Acknowledged the strong protections given the news media by the First Amendment, saying, "I can't tell them what to do." Kistler claimed court officials had not noticed that the newspapers were on the list of expungement orders sought by lawyer Amendola. "It was a breakdown under the rush of the system," Kistler said.

Arrest of photographer 
A riot broke out in downtown State College, Pennsylvania on October 25, 2008, after no. 3 Penn State Football defeated no. 10 Ohio State Football 13-6. Daily Collegian photographer, Michael Felletter, was on assignment documenting the riot when he was arrested by police officers after he allegedly did not comply with orders to leave the area. Felletter was charged with failure to disperse, a second-degree misdemeanor, and disorderly conduct, a third-degree misdemeanor.

Police alleged Felletter's presence had caused the crowd to become more exuberant, excited, and destructive. Felletter alleged that officers expressed no problem with him being there and that he was only asked to leave the scene of the riot once by an officer Argiro. Felletter denied police charges that he refused to leave the scene when asked. He alleged the same officer Argiro threatened him with pepper spray and arrest, and when he continued to take pictures of Argiro over his shoulder as he was leaving the scene.

Felletter was represented pro bono on behalf of the American Civil Liberties Union. Centre County District Attorney, Michael Madeira, claimed that the case centered around Felletter's refusal to obey a police order and not around the First Amendment or the photographer's journalistic activity. The Magisterial District Judge Carmine Prestia dismissed Felletter's disorderly conduct charge saying the crowd's actions were not Felletter's fault. The judge also dismissed all of the counts of failure to disperse but one, saying a sole charge was sufficient claiming the press is not above the law.

Felletter lawyer argued coverage of the riot was valuable to both citizens and the government and that these charges violated the second amendment. Felletter lawyer cited the State College Police use of Felletter's photographs in facilitating the identification of others involved in the riot who were ultimately prosecuted. Centre County Judge David E. Grine dismissed the remaining charge, failure to disperse, against the photographer citing "unclear" evidence. Grine ruled it is uncertain whether Felletter's compliance with police orders to "move along" was adequate when he moved from the street to sidewalk. Additionally, Grine blamed the rioters for their behavior—not Felletter, according to the ruling. After initially requesting an appeal, Centre County District Attorney Stacy Parks Miller filed a motion to drop the appeal.

The Collegian Chronicles 
The book, The Collegian Chronicles: A History of Penn State from the Pages of The Daily Collegian (1887-2006) was published by the Collegian Alumni Interest Group and edited by Marv Krasnansky in 2006. It includes a detailed history of Penn State life told by more than 90 former Collegian members, including editors, reporters and business managers.

The Paper 
The Daily Collegian is the subject of a documentary film called The Paper. The film was directed by Aaron Matthews, who used the student newspaper as a case study for the problems that face all newspapers today—flagging circulation, minority coverage, and access to sources. The film made official selection at multiple festivals, including the 2007 Philadelphia Film Festival.

The film was co-produced by Aaron Matthews and the Independent Television Service and had major funding from the Corporation for Public Broadcasting. Distribution for the film was carried out by Icarus Films.

Released and distributed in 2007, the documentary was filmed from 2004-2005 and followed the newspaper while Editor-in-Chief James Young ran the staff.

Cinematography for the film was done by Wayne De La Roche and the music was composed by Tim Nackashi.

The Birmingham Weekly called it "An insightful new documentary", while the Boston Globe stated, "What we see at the Collegian is a resonant microcosm: This paper's crucible is every paper's."

James Building demolition 

On November 29, 2018 after 30 years in the James Building a university-owned property in downtown State College the Collegian announced a plan to move into the new Donald P. Bellisario Media Center, which was planned to open in the fall of 2020 at the site of the Willard Building.

Penn State had announced plans earlier in the year their plan to demolish the 100-year James Building located at 121-123 S. Burrowes St. and replace it with a $52.8 million building that, "Will serve as a hub for the Invent Penn State entrepreneurial and innovation initiative,".

The space the Collegian is slated to move to will be in a closed, 852-square-foot corner of its third floor. The private “Collegian Suite,” will face a large open newsroom with designated Collegian desk space. However, some other student news organizations have been invited to utilize said newsroom as well.

In the fall semester of 2019 the James Building was demolished and the Collegian moved its office to Midtown Square, another university-owned property in downtown State College. The media center is scheduled for completion in Fall 2020 and ready for student and faculty and students to begin working there in Spring 2021.

Coronavirus 
On January 24, 2020 Penn State announced it was monitoring an outbreak of COVID-19 as it had begun to spread inside of the United States. In February, Penn State restricted travel to China, Italy and Japan as well as requiring students returning from CDC level 3 threat countries to be quarantined. During Spring Break, on March 11, 2020, as the COVID-19 pandemic was becoming a threat in the United States, Penn State canceled all in-person classes at its 20 campuses until at least April 3 which was later extended to the remainder of their spring and summer semesters. Students and faculty were asked to stay home, and away from campus because of the outbreak. The Print Edition of The Daily Collegian, printed bi-weekly, was suspended and all news coverage was posted digitally.

Newspaper Burning 
In 1993, the paper criticized the Society for Professional Journalists after it offered a $250 reward for information on the persons who stole half a conservative campus newspaper's run, burning part of it. The Collegian said the thieves were engaging in constitutionally protected speech.

Collegian publications 
 The Daily Collegian 
The print newspaper publication is printed Monday and Thursday while classes are in session in the fall and spring. No issues are published on Labor Day, the week of Thanksgiving, Martin Luther King Day or the week of spring break. The paper is distributed on the University Park campus. The paper mostly covers local, state, national and international events and news pertaining to Penn State as well as Penn State sports and opinion columns.

 The Daily Collegian Online
The Collegian's website includes all content created for the outlet. This includes digital copies of the print edition, all articles published, video, photo, podcasts, as well as a searchable archive.

 Daily Collegian Podcast Network
 Daily Collegian video production

Notable alumni

Editor-in-Chiefs 

† Resigned

The Daily Collegian 
 2022-:’’’ Megan Swift
 2021-2022:’’’ Jade Campos
 2020-2021: Maddie Aiken 
 2019-2020: Elena Rose 
 2018-2019: Kelly Powers
 2017-2018: Sam Ruland
 2016-2017: 	Garrett Ross
 2015-2016: 	Shannon Sweeney
 2014-2015: 	Sam Janesch
 2013-2014: 	Brittany Horn
 2012-2013: 	Casey McDermott
 2011-2012: 	Lexi Belculfine
 2010-2011: 	Liz Murphy
 2009-2010: 	Rossilynne Skena
 2008-2009: 	Terry Casey
 2007-2008: 	Devon Lash
 2006-2007: 	Erin James
 2005-2006: 	Jennette C. Hannah
 2004-2005: 	Jimmy Young
 2003-2004: 	Lynne Funk
 2002-2003: 	Alison Kepner
 2001-2002: 	Jill Leonard
 2000-2001: 	Patricia Tisak
 1999-2000: 	Stacey Confer
 1998-1999: Bridgette Blair
 1998: 	Megan Donley
 1997-1998: 	Julie Randall†
 1997: 	Rachel Hogan†
 1996-1997: 	Jason Alt
 1995-1996: 	Courtney Cairns
 1994-1995: 	Angela Pomponio
 1993-1994: 	Mike Abrams
 1992-1993: 	Bridget Mount
 1991-1992: 	Isabel Molina
 1990-1991: 	Ted Sickler
 1989-1990: 	Diane A. Davis
 1988-1989: 	Carolyn Sorisio
 1987-1988: 	Christopher Raymond
 1986: 	Anita Huslin
 1985: 	Gail Johnson
 1984: 	Alecia Swasy
 1983: 	Suzanne M. Cassidy
 1982-1983: 	Phil Gutis
 1981-1982: 	Paula Froke
 1980-1981: 	Betsy Long
 1979-1980: 	Peter Barnes
 1978-1979: 	David Skidmore
 1977-1978: 	Jeffrey Hawkes
 1976-1977: 	Sheila McCauley
 1975-1976: 	Jerry Schwartz
 1974-1975: 	Diane M. Nottle
 1973-1974: 	Patricia J. Stewart
 1972-1973: 	Paul J. Schafer
 1970-1972: 	Robert J. McHugh
 1969-1970: 	James R. Dorris
 1968-1969: 	Paul Levine
 1967-1968: 	Richard Wiesenhutter
 1966-1967: 	William F. Lee
 1965-1966: 	John Lott
 1964-1965: 	John R. Thompson
 1963-1964: 	C. David Bolbach
 1962-1963: 	Ann Palmer
 1960-1962: 	John W. Black
 1959-1960: 	Dennis Malick
 1958-1959: 	Robert Franklin
 1957-1958: 	Edward Dubbs
 1956-1957: 	Michael Moyle
 1955-1956: 	Myron Feinsilber
 1955: 	Norman C. Miller Jr
 1954-1955: 	Diehl McKalip
 1953-1954: 	David Jones
 1952-1953: 	David Pellnitz
 1951-1952: 	Marvin Krasnansky
 1950-1951: 	Dean Gladfelter
 1949-1950: 	Thomas E. Morgan
 1948-1949: 	Lewis Stone
 1947-1948: Allan Ostar
 1946-1947: Michael A. Blatz
 1945-1946: Woodene Bell
 1945: Helen Hatton
 1945: Victor Danilov
 1945: Emil A. Kubek
 1944: Lee H. Learner
 1943-1944: Alice R. Fox 
 1943: 	Jane H. Murphy 
 1943: 	Paul I. Woodland
 1942-1943: Gordon Coy
 1941-1942: Ross B. Lehman
 1940-1941: 	Adam A. Smyser

Penn State Collegian 
 1939-1940: William Engel Jr.
 1938-1939: John A. Troanovitch
 1937-1938: Charles M. Wheeler Jr.
 1936-1937: Johnson Brenneman
 1935-1936: Harry B. Henderson Jr.
 1934-1935: John A. Brutzman
 1933-1934: Charles A. Myers
 1932-1933: Robert E. Tschan
 1931-1932: Hugh R. Riley Jr.
 1930-1931: William K. Ulerich
 1929-1930: James H. Coogan Jr.
 1927-1929: Louis H. Bell Jr.
 1926-1927: Wheeler Lord Jr.
 1926-1927: W. P. Reed
 1925-1926: H. W. Cohen
 1924-1925: W. L. Pratt
 1923-1924: E. E. Helm
 1922-1923: E. D. Schive
 1921-1922: A. G. Pratt
 1920-1921: Frederick H. Leuschner
 1919-1920: G. S. Wykoff
 1919: G. W. Sullivan
 1917-1918: D. M. Cresswell
 1916-1917: Edmund J. Kenney
 1915: D. McKay Jr.
 1914-1915: J. R. Mathers
 1913-1914: J. D. Hogarth
 1912-1913: R. M. Evans 
 1911-1912: W. S. Kriebel Jr.

State Collegian 
 1911: W. S. Kriebel Jr.
 1910-1911: C. MacC. Breitinger
 1909-1910: A. W. Fisher
 1907-1909: C. N. Fleming
 1906-1907: K. Little
 1905-1906: T. F. Foltzt
 1904-1905: Alex Hart
 1904: W. B. Hoke

The Free Lance 
 1903-1904: E. K. McDowell
 1902-1903: F. H. Taylor
 1901-1902: J. E. Wagner
 1900-1901: H. H. Hanson
 1899-1900: F. T. Cole
 1899: William L. Affelder
 1898: George J. Yundt
 1897-1898: R. T. Strohm
 1896-1897: H. H. Allen
 1895-1896: H. A. Kuhn
 1894-1895: D. L. Patterson
 1893-1894: W. A. Silliman
 1892-1893: Geo R. Weiland
 1892: R. B. Mattern
 1891-1902: Nelson McA. Loyd
 1890-1891: Walter M. Camp
 1889-1890: George R. Meek
 1888-1889: Curtin G. Roop
 1888: Geo M. Downing
 1887: Griffith J. Thomas
 1887: William P. Fisher Jr.

Awards

References

External links 
The Daily Collegian Online
The Paper (2007 Documentary Film)
The Collegian Chronicles (book)
Historical Digital Collegian (database)

Pennsylvania State University
Student newspapers published in Pennsylvania
Non-profit organizations based in Pennsylvania
Publications established in the 1880s
Publications established in 1887